Lissotesta beta is an extinct species of sea snail, a marine gastropod mollusk, unassigned in the superfamily Seguenzioidea.

Distribution
This species occurs in New Zealand.

References

beta